Mary Poonen Lukose was an Indian gynecologist, obstetrician and the first female Surgeon General in India. She was the founder of a Tuberculosis Sanatorium in Nagarcoil and the X-Ray and Radium Institute, Thiruvananthapuram, served as the head of the Health Department in the Princely State of Travancore and was the first woman legislator of the state. The Government of India awarded her the fourth highest Indian civilian award of Padma Shri in 1975.

Biography
Mary Lukose, née Mary Poonen, was born to a rich Anglican Syrian Christian family as the only child on 2 August 1886 in Aymanam—a small village later made famous by being the setting of the novel The God of Small Things— in the princely state of Travancore (modern day Kerala), in the British Indian Empire. Her father, T. E. Poonen, was a medical doctor, the first medical graduate in Travancore and the Royal Physician of Travancore state. Her mother had health issues due to which Mary was brought up by British governesses. She completed her schooling at Holy Angel's Convent High School, Thiruvananthapuram and topped the matriculation examination. However, she was denied admission for science subjects at the Maharajas College, Thiruvananthapuram (present day University College Thiruvananthapuram) for being a woman and had to pursue studies in history on which she graduated (BA) in 1909 as the only female student of the college and the first woman graduate of Madras University which Maharajas College was affiliated to. As Indian universities did not offer admission to women for medicine, she moved to London and secured MBBS from the London University, the first woman from what would later become Kerala to graduate in medicine. She continued in the UK to obtain MRCOG (gynecology and obstetrics) from Rotunda Hospital, Dublin and underwent advanced training in pediatrics at the Great Ormond Street Hospital. Later she worked in various hospitals in the UK and simultaneously pursued music studies to pass the London Music Examination.

Mary returned to India in 1916, the year her father died, took up the post of an obstetrician at the Women and Children Hospital, Thycaud in Thiruvananthapuram and also worked as the superintendent of the hospital, replacing a westerner who had returned to her native place after marriage. A year later, she married Kunnukuzhiyil Kurivilla Lukose (K. K. Lukose), a lawyer who would later become a judge of the High Court of Travancore. K. K. Lukose was an Indian Orthodox Christian. During her tenure at Thycaud Hospital, she initiated a midwifery training program for the children of local midwives in order to win over their support and is known to have delivered her first born at the hospital. In 1922 she was nominated to the legislative assembly of Travancore, known as Sree Chitra State Council, thus becoming the first woman legislator in the state. Two years later, she was promoted as the Acting Surgeon General of the state of Travancore, making her the first woman to be appointed as the surgeon general in India. She continued at the hospital till 1938 during which time she was nominated to the state assembly continuously till 1937. In 1938, she became the Surgeon General, in charge of 32 government hospitals, 40 government dispensaries and 20 private institutions. She is reported to have been the first woman to be appointed as the surgeon general in the world; the first woman surgeon general in the US was appointed only in 1990.

Mary was one of the founders of the Thiruvananthapuram chapter of the Young Women's Christian Association (YWCA) and became its founder president in 1918, a position she retained till 1968. She served as the Chief Commissioner of the Girl Guides in India and was also a founder member of the Indian Medical Association and the Federation of Obstetric and Gynaecological Societies of India (FOGSI), which started as Obstetric and Gynaecological Society. As the surgeon general of the state, she is reported to have founded the Tuberculosis Sanatorium in Nagarcoil, one of the first sanatoriums in India, which later grew to become the Kanyakumari Government Medical College. She also founded the X-Ray and Radium Institute in Thiruvananthapuram.

Mary and Lukose had two children, the eldest, Gracie, a medical doctor and a former assistant professor at  Lady Hardinge Medical College, New Delhi and the youngest, K. P. Lukose, former consul general, permanent representative of India to the United Nations and the Indian ambassador to Bulgaria. Her husband died in 1947 and her two children also preceded her in death. She died on 2 October 1976 at the age of 90. She was a recipient of the title, Vaidyasasthrakusala, from Chithira Thirunal Balarama Varma, the last Maharaja of Travancore. The Government of India awarded her the civilian honour of Padma Shri in 1975.

See also

 Kanyakumari Government Medical College

References

Further reading
 

Recipients of the Padma Shri in medicine
1886 births
1976 deaths
People from Kottayam district
Malayali people
Indian gynaecologists
Indian women gynaecologists
20th-century Indian women scientists
Indian women surgeons
Indian surgeons
University College Thiruvananthapuram alumni
University of Madras alumni
Medical doctors from Kerala
19th-century Indian medical doctors
20th-century Indian medical doctors
19th-century Indian women scientists
Women scientists from Kerala
20th-century women physicians
19th-century women physicians
20th-century surgeons